Pullenia is a monotypic genus of flowering plants belonging to the family Fabaceae. It only has one known, species Pullenia gunnii 

It is native to New Caledonia, New Guinea, New South Wales, Queensland, Tasmania and Victoria (Australia).

The genus name of Pullenia is in honour of Royal 'Roy' Pullen (1925 - 2009), who was an Australian plant collector. Including between 1957-1972 collecting in Papua New Guinea. 

The genus was circumscribed by Hiroyoshi Ohashi and Kazuaki K. Ohashi in J. Jap. Bot. vol.93 (Issue 5) on pages 299-301 in  2018.

Description

It has  3-foliolate leaves; leaflets rhombic and truncate at apex, subglabrous, a few hairs on veins on lower surface, terminal leaflets 0.5–2 cm long, 7–11 mm wide, lateral leaflets smaller; petiole 10–30 mm long; stipules 2–4 mm long.

The flowers are 1–1.2 mm long and in shades of pink or lavender.

Pods are up to 30 mm long; with a dense indumentum of spreading hooked hairs and has up to 6 articles (a fruit with constrictions between the seeds) which are 4–5 mm long.

References

Fabaceae genera
Flora of Australia
Flora of New Caledonia
Flora of New Guinea
Plants described in 2018